Crescent Park is a city park located in the north-east quadrant of Grand Rapids, Michigan. Although small in size, it provides a quiet patch of green space near to the heart of the growing city.

History 
Crescent Park is thought to be Grand Rapids’ oldest park. The land was deeded to the city for use as a park in October 1858, and received its name from the outline of the land, a half-moon shape originally bounded by roads. The west side of the park contains a steep hill which was originally bisected by a flight of 56 stone steps. Just east of the head of the steps was a water fountain.

Renovation 
Crescent Park was renovated in 2010 in conjunction with the expansion of the Van Andel Institute. Friends of Crescent Park, a nonprofit organization, was created to renovate and maintain the park. The new park contains a plaza in tribute to those who have found hope from the many medical facilities around the park and along the Medical Mile.

Amenities 
Metal picnic tables, stone benches, metered parking on Bostwick Ave, long curving stairway, view of downtown Grand Rapids, lawn area, shaded grass, curving walkways, cancer survivor plaza

References

External links 
 http://www.vai.org
 Pictures of the park
 Pictures of the plaza

Urban public parks
Parks in Grand Rapids, Michigan